This is a list of diplomatic missions of the Gambia. The Republic of the Gambia became independent from Britain in 1965. As a relatively small country in West Africa, the Gambia has only a limited number of foreign missions abroad.

Africa

 Algiers (Embassy)

 Addis Ababa (Embassy)

 Bissau (Embassy)

Nouakchott (Embassy)

 Rabat (Embassy)
 Dakhla (Consulate-General)

 Abuja (High Commission)
 Lagos (Liaison Office)

 Dakar (Embassy)

 Freetown (High Commission)

 Pretoria (High Commission)

Americas

 Havana (Embassy)

 Washington, D.C. (Embassy)

Asia

 Beijing (Embassy)

 New Delhi (High Commission)

 Kuala Lumpur (High Commission)

 Doha (Embassy)

 Riyadh (Embassy)
 Jeddah (Consulate-General)

 Ankara (Embassy)

 Abu Dhabi (Embassy)

Europe

 Brussels (Embassy)

 Paris (Embassy)

 Moscow (Embassy)

 Madrid (Embassy)

Geneva (Embassy)

 London (High Commission)

Multilateral organisations

 African Union
Addis Ababa (delegation to the African Union)
 Economic Community of West African States
Abuja (delegation to the ECOWAS)

Brussels (delegation to the European Union)

New York City (delegation to the United Nations)
Vienna (delegation to the UNIDO, CTBTO and United Nations in Vienna)

Gallery

See also
Foreign relations of the Gambia
List of diplomatic missions in the Gambia

References

External links

 Gambian Ministry of Foreign Affairs
 Gambian High Commission to the United Kingdom
 Gambian embassy to the United States

List
Diplomatic missions
Gambia